Bohemaniella is a genus of beetles in the family Carabidae, containing the following species:

 Bohemaniella africana (Putzeys, 1876)
 Bohemaniella brevilobis (H. W. Bates, 1886)
 Bohemaniella gigantea (Boheman, 1848)
 Bohemaniella minor (Péringuey, 1896)

References

Scaritinae